"The Ballad of High Noon" (also known simply as "High Noon", or by its opening lyric and better known title, "Do Not Forsake Me, Oh My Darlin'") is a popular song published in 1952, with music by Dimitri Tiomkin and lyrics by Ned Washington.

It is the theme song of the 1952 multiple Academy Award-winning movie High Noon (and titled onscreen as such in the film's opening credits as sung by popular country music singer and actor Tex Ritter), with its tune repeated throughout the film. It was awarded the 1952 Academy Award for Best Original Song, and was performed that night for the Academy by Ritter.  There were only three instruments accompanying Ritter on the soundtrack: guitar, accordion, and the Hammond Novachord, the first electronic synthesizer, which created an unusual gourd-like percussion background.

The song appears at number 25 on "AFI's 100 Years...100 Songs". Members of the Western Writers of America chose it as one of the Top 100 Western songs of all time.

Other versions
 Frankie Laine (1952) – US No. 5; UK No. 7
 Tex Ritter (1952) – US No. 12 
 Fred Waring & His Pennsylvanians (1952)
 Eddie Fisher with Alex Stordahl Orchestra & Chorus (1955)
 Jimmie Rodgers (1959)
 Johnny Bond (1961)
 Connie Francis (1961)
 Sons of the Pioneers (1962)
 Faron Young (1963)
 Walter Brennan (1964)

References

External links

 

1952 songs
Tex Ritter songs
Frankie Laine songs
Best Original Song Academy Award-winning songs
Songs with lyrics by Ned Washington
Songs with music by Dimitri Tiomkin